New Market is an unincorporated community located within Piscataway Township in Middlesex County, New Jersey, United States. It was also known historically as Quibbletown, so called because of a dispute as to whether the Sabbath was on Saturday or Sunday.

Columbus Park
The Columbus Park playground with areas for baseball and tennis is located at 250 11th Street. The Columbus Park gazebo area located at the west end on New Market Pond is often used for concerts. The Battle of Quibbletown, fought on February 8, 1777, was commemorated in the park for the 350th anniversary of the township's founding in 2016.

References

External links
 

Piscataway, New Jersey
Unincorporated communities in Middlesex County, New Jersey
Unincorporated communities in New Jersey